The Final Tic is the debut full-length album by American hip hop group Crucial Conflict from Chicago, Illinois. It was released on July 2, 1996 through Pallas Records and Universal Records, and was entirely produced by member Ralph "Wildstyle" Leverston. The album was a success due in large part to the group's breakthrough single "Hay", peaking at number 18 on the Billboard Hot 100 singles chart. The album itself also found success in the United States charts, peaking at number 12 on the Billboard 200 albums chart and at number 5 on the Top R&B/Hip-Hop Albums chart. "Hay" was certified gold on July 19, 1996, and The Final Tic was also certified gold on September 4, 1996 by the Recording Industry Association of America.

Track listing

Personnel

Crucial Conflict
Corey "Coldhard" Johnson – main artist, vocals
Wondosas "Kilo" Martin – main artist, vocals
Marrico "Never" King – main artist, vocals
Ralph "Wildstyle" Leverston – main artist, producer, engineering (tracks: 1-12, 14-15)
Additional vocalists
QBall – vocals (tracks: 5, 10)
LaTaunya "Toy" Bounds – vocals (tracks: 11, 15)
Sheena Lee – vocals (track 7)
Tasha Keller – vocals (track 13)
T-Babe – vocals (track 15)

Technical
Ernie Allen – engineering (track 13)
Stan Wallace – mixing (tracks: 1, 6)
Chris Shepherd – mixing (tracks: 2, 5, 7, 9, 10, 12)
Jeff Lane – mixing (tracks: 2, 9)
Tom Carlyle – mixing (tracks: 3, 4, 11, 13-15)
Ron Lowe – mixing (tracks: 3, 4, 11, 13-15)
Dennis Ferrante – mastering
Fred Brathwaite – executive producer
Roy "Black Prince" Cormier – executive producer
Shorty Capone – executive producer
Miguel Rivera – design
Daniel Hastings – photography

Charts

Weekly charts

Year-end charts

Certifications

References

External links 
 
 The Final Tic by Crucial Conflict on iTunes

1996 debut albums
Crucial Conflict albums
Universal Records albums